John Joseph O'Neill (10 January 1873 – 29 June 1935) was catcher in Major League Baseball who played for the St. Louis Cardinals (1902–03), Chicago Cubs (1904–05) and Boston Beaneaters (1906). He batted and threw right-handed.

He was born in the townland of Tawnaleen, near Maum, in County Galway, Ireland, to Michael O'Neill, a small farmer in Maum, and Mary Joyce.

O'Neill was one of four major league brothers. Steve was a catcher and manager, Jim a shortstop, and Mike, who also was born in Ireland, was a pitcher and formed a brother battery with Jack for the St. Louis Cardinals.

O'Neill shared catching duties for the Cardinals, Cubs and Beaneaters in a modest span of five years. He was a smart runner with some speed and usually was used in pinch-running situations. His most productive season came in 1903, when he posted career-highs in batting average (.236), runs (23), hits (58), doubles (nine), runs batted in (21), stolen bases (11) and games played (75).

In 303 games O'Neill was a .196 hitter with 20 stolen bases and 74 RBI. He also collected 185 hits with 24 doubles, five triples, and one home run in 945 at-bats.

O'Neill died in Scranton, Pennsylvania, at the age of 62.

See also
List of players from Ireland in Major League Baseball

References

External links
 Baseball Reference
Baseball Reference - 1902 debuts
Retrosheet

1873 births
1935 deaths
19th-century Irish people
20th-century Irish people
Boston Beaneaters players
Chicago Cubs players
St. Louis Cardinals players
Irish emigrants to the United States (before 1923)
Sportspeople from County Galway
Major League Baseball catchers
Major League Baseball players from Ireland
Irish baseball players
Baseball players from Pennsylvania
Rochester Brownies players
Montreal Royals players
Cortland Hirelings players
Canandaigua Giants players
Scranton Miners players
Hartford Indians players
Syracuse Stars (minor league baseball) players
Utica Reds players
Utica Pentups players
Jersey City Skeeters players